Rutstroemiaceae is a family of fungi in the order Helotiales. Species in this family have a cosmopolitan distribution, especially in temperate areas.

References 

Helotiales
Ascomycota families